Proebstel is an unincorporated community in Clark County, in the U.S. state of Washington.

History
A post office called Proebstel was established in 1886, and remained in operation until 1907. The community was named after John Proebstel, an early settler.

References

Unincorporated communities in Clark County, Washington
Unincorporated communities in Washington (state)